Oliver Wesley Barnett (born April 9, 1966, in Louisville, Kentucky) is a former American football defensive end in the National Football League who played for the Atlanta Falcons, Buffalo Bills, and San Francisco 49ers.

References

1966 births
Living people
Players of American football from Louisville, Kentucky
American football defensive ends
American football defensive tackles
Kentucky Wildcats football players
Atlanta Falcons players
Buffalo Bills players
San Francisco 49ers players
Barcelona Dragons players